{{Speciesbox
| image = Band-tailed Sierra Finch.jpg
| status = LC
| status_system = IUCN3.1
| status_ref = 
| genus = Porphyrospiza
| species = alaudina
| authority = (Kittlitz, 1833)
| synonyms =  
 Fringilla alaudina von Kittlitz, 1833
 Corydospiza alaudina Phrygilus alaudinus Porphyrospiza alaudina Rhopospina alaudina}}

The band-tailed sierra finch (Porphyrospiza alaudina'') is a species of bird in the family Thraupidae and is found in Argentina, Bolivia, Chile, Ecuador, and Peru. Its natural habitats are subtropical or tropical dry shrubland and subtropical or tropical high-altitude shrubland.

References

band-tailed sierra finch
Birds of the Andes
Birds of Chile
band-tailed sierra finch
Taxa named by Heinrich von Kittlitz
Taxonomy articles created by Polbot
Taxobox binomials not recognized by IUCN